In enzymology, a maltose-transporting ATPase is an enzyme that catalyzes the chemical reaction

ATP + H2O + maltoseout  ADP + phosphate + maltosein

The 3 substrates of this enzyme are ATP, H2O, and maltose, whereas its 3 products are ADP, phosphate, and maltose.

This enzyme belongs to the family of hydrolases, specifically those acting on acid anhydrides to catalyse transmembrane movement of substances. The systematic name of this enzyme class is ATP phosphohydrolase (maltose-importing). This enzyme is a member of the ABC Transporter family.

Structural studies

References

 
 
 
 
 

EC 3.6.3
Enzymes of known structure